is a passenger railway station on the Tōhoku Main Line (Utsunomiya Line) located in Kita-ku, Saitama, Saitama Prefecture, Japan, operated by East Japan Railway Company (JR East).

Lines

Station layout
This station has an elevated station building with one island platform underneath. The station is staffed.

Platforms

History
Toro Station opened on 1 October 1983. With the privatization of JNR on 1 April 1987, the station came under the control of JR East.

Passenger statistics
In fiscal 2019, the station was used by an average of 15,861 passengers daily (boarding passengers only).

Surrounding area
Saitama City, Kita-ku Ward Office
Toro Nishi-guchi Post Office

See also
 List of railway stations in Japan

References

External links

  JR East station information 

Railway stations in Saitama (city)
Railway stations in Japan opened in 1983
Tōhoku Main Line
Utsunomiya Line